Arhopala buddha is a species of butterfly belonging to the lycaenid family described by George Thomas Bethune-Baker in 1903. It is found in Southeast Asia (Burma, Mergui, Peninsular Malaya, southern Thailand, Sumatra, Bangka, Borneo, Siberut, the Philippines and Java).

Subspecies
Arhopala buddha buddha (Java)
Arhopala buddha cooperi (Evans, [1925]) (southern Burma, Mergui, Peninsular Malaysia, southern Thailand, Sumatra, Bangka, Siberut, Philippines)
Arhopala buddha whiteheadi Corbet, 1946 (Borneo)

References

Arhopala
Butterflies described in 1903
Butterflies of Asia
Taxa named by George Thomas Bethune-Baker